Gruppo Sportivo Dilettantistico Castelfidardo, commonly referred to as Castelfidardo, is an Italian football club based in Castelfidardo, Marche. Currently it plays in Italy's Serie D.

History

Foundation
The club was founded in 1944.

Serie D 
In the season 2013–14 the team was promoted, from Eccellenza Marche to Serie D after winning the national play-off.

Colors and badge 
The team's colors are white and green.

References

External links
 Official homepage

Football clubs in Italy
Football clubs in the Marche
Association football clubs established in 1944
1944 establishments in Italy